Bent Ånund Ramsfjell (born 30 November 1967 in Oslo) is a Norwegian curler from Asker. He is the younger brother of Eigil Ramsfjell, multiple curling world champion and bronze medallist at the 1998 Winter Olympics competition in Nagano.

Ramsfjell currently plays lead for the Norwegian team skipped by Pål Trulsen. He has played lead for the team since the 1999 World Curling Championships. With the team, Ramsfjell has won an Olympic gold medal (2002), a European Curling Championships gold medal (2005), a World Championships silver medal (2002), two World Championships bronze medals (2001, 2003) and a European Championships bronze medal (2004).

At the 1997 World Championships, Ramsfjell played second for Trulsen, and it was Ramsfjell's first worlds. In 1992, Ramsfjell was the lead for Eigil Ramsfjell at the European championships, and was his alternate at the 1989 European championships. Bent played second for Thomas Ulsrud at the 1989 World Junior Curling Championships.

References

External links
 

1967 births
Curlers at the 2002 Winter Olympics
Curlers at the 2006 Winter Olympics
Living people
Norwegian male curlers
Olympic curlers of Norway
Olympic gold medalists for Norway
Olympic medalists in curling
Medalists at the 2002 Winter Olympics
Continental Cup of Curling participants
European curling champions
Sportspeople from Oslo